Stadionul Prof. Costică Popovici is a multi-purpose stadium in Valea Mărului, Romania. It is currently used mostly for football matches, is the home ground of Avântul Valea Mărului and holds 1,000 people.

References

External links
Stadionul Prof. Costică Popovici at soccerway.com

Football venues in Romania
Sport in Galați County
Buildings and structures in Galați County